Harry Lubin (March 5, 1906 – July 21, 1977) was an American composer, arranger, and pianist.  He is known for composing the theme and much of the music for the second season of the television series The Outer Limits and One Step Beyond.

Biography 
Lubin's professional career spanned over 40 years, as a composer and conductor in many Broadway productions and recordings, the concert stage, in radio, television and motion pictures. He worked with many top names in entertainment, including Jan Peerce, Robert Merrill, Robert Weade, Selma Kaye, Al Jolson, Eddie Cantor, Dinah Shore, Fran Warren, and Connie Haines.

Early years 
Lubin began his career in 1925, as piano accompanist for basso Feodor Chaliapin.  By age 20, he became the musical director of the Irving Place Theatre in New York. He left Irving Place to become one of the youngest musical directors in the foreign department of the Aeolian, Vocalian, and later, the Brunswick Phonograph Company.

Theater and film 
Lubin composed and arranged for numerous productions including The Eternal Mother in 1928 and Max Gordon's Making Mary in 1932.  He worked with Samuel Roxy Rothafel at his theatre, and later at NBC. He joined the Advertisers Broadcasters Company as musical director in 1938, working on up to 28 shows each week during his seven-year tenure, returning to Broadway in 1942 to compose the music for Sidney Kingsley's play The Patriot.

Radio and television 
In January 1945, Lubin became the musical director of the radio program Glamour Manor, starring Kenny Baker, and made his television debut as musical director for the first Pinky Lee Show, which he stayed with until the program went off the air in 1953.

When Loretta Young decided to take a recess from her motion picture career and star in her own television series, Lubin was selected as musical director. In addition to composing and conducting, he also composed the theme music, "Letter to Loretta", (Loretta Young.

Lubin is perhaps best known for the music he created for the sci-fi television programs, One Step Beyond and The Outer Limits, where he pioneered an effective combination of orchestra, theremin and female voice.

Music publisher CPM (formerly Carlin Recorded Music Library, now part of Warner/Chappell Production Music) acquired Lubin's publishing company, Harrose, in 2005.

References

Further reading

External links 
 
 
 
 

1906 births
1977 deaths
American film score composers
American television composers
American male film score composers
Male television composers
American classical pianists
American male pianists
20th-century American pianists
20th-century American male musicians